Samuel Ringgold Ward (October 17, 1817 – ) was an African American who escaped enslavement to become an abolitionist, newspaper editor, labor leader, and Congregational church minister.

He was author of the influential book Autobiography of a Fugitive Negro: his anti-slavery labours in the United States, Canada and England, written after his speeches throughout Britain in 1853. It enabled him to raise funds for the Anti-slavery Society of Canada, where many escaped slaves from the USA were arriving in the 1850s.

Early life
Samuel Ringgold Ward was born into slavery in 1817 on Maryland's eastern shore but fled as a child with his parents in 1820 to New Jersey and soon relocated to New York in 1826. Once settled, Ward's parents enrolled him in at the African Free School.

Pastoral and abolition work
His beliefs in the end of slavery and his oratory skills led him to politics where he joined first the Liberty Party in 1840, where he remained until 1848, and later the Free Soil Party in 1848, becoming one of the few from the latter party that was interested in the abolitionist aspect of preventing further inclusion of slave states into the union. Indeed, at the Liberty Party National Convention in June 1848, Ward received 12 out of a possible 84 votes to place second in balloting for that party's nomination as their candidate for the office of U.S. Vice President.

Other abolitionists, both white and black, were well aware of Ward's oratory abilities and commended his brilliant efforts in the abolitionist movement. His activities brought him in close contact with fellow orator and abolitionist Frederick Douglass, who said of him, "As an orator and thinker [Ward] was vastly superior to any of us" and that "the splendors of his intellect went directly to the glory of race."

Little progress had been made in America while he had been away and he was to record that "here I saw more of the foolishness, wickedness, and at the same time the invincibility, of American Negro-hate, than I ever saw elsewhere". While there, his youngest son, William Reynolds Ward, died and was buried; and two of his daughters, Emily and Alice, were born. From Cortland, the family moved to Syracuse, New York, in 1851. However, the stay was brief, on account of Samuel Ward participating in the "Jerry Rescue" on the first day of October in that year, leading him to emigrate in some haste to Canada that November.

During the last few years of Samuel Ward's residence in the United States he had become editor and part owner of two newspapers; the Farmer and Northern Star, and Boston's Impartial Citizen.  He was a firm believer in the need for "anti-slavery labors, organizations, agitation, and newspapers" and conscious of the need to keep the papers from being censured, or worse as in the death of Elijah P. Lovejoy, he commenced the study of law.

The first African-American labor leader
Freed blacks during the Antebellum also faced discrimination in employment, as black laborers were not welcome in most unions. In response, Frederick Douglass and Ward helped organize the American League of Colored Laborers, the first black American labor union. Assembled on June 13, 1850 in the lecture room of Zion’s church in New York City, the League appointed Samuel Ringgold Ward as its first president, Frederick Douglass as its vice-president, and Henry Bibb as its secretary. Although short-lived and stymied by the small number of black workers in cities at the time, the union’s goals included the creation of a fund to give loans to black entrepreneurs, the creation of a bank that would provide credit and encourage saving, and an industrial fair.

Anti-slavery work in Britain
In Canada, he worked with Mary Ann Shadd Cary to found a newspaper, The Provincial Freeman, in 1853. While she was the editor-in-chief, as the first woman publisher in North America, she was afraid of not being taken seriously and originally hid her involvement with the paper by putting Ward's and the Rev. Alexander McArthur's names on the masthead.

"Proclaimed editor of this bold venture, Ward only lent his name to the newspaper to generate interest and subscriptions."

He was then offered work by the Anti-slavery Society of Canada, who decided he should visit Britain to further their anti-slavery work. He was given the names of contacts in London who would be keen to accommodate his visit, to strengthen their own long-standing anti-slavery work, and might be willing to help organise fund-raising for anti-slavery work in Canada.

Ward's preparation paid off and he was well received in Britain early in 1853; as Samuel Ward records:

At the annual meeting of the Congregational Union, Samuel Ward was formally introduced to the body by the Secretary, Rev. George Smith of Trinity Independent Chapel, in company with Rev. Charles Beecher, the brother of Harriet Beecher Stowe, whom he had not met before. A dinner for the Congregational ministers and delegates was organised at Radley's Hotel, at which Samuel Ward gave his first London anti-slavery speech about the need for financial support in Canada: 

Samuel Ward's visit to London was, he considered, at a most fortunate time for his fund-raising endeavour, because: "of the twofold fact that Uncle Tom's Cabin was in every body's hands and heart, and its gifted authoress was the English people's guest. For anti-slavery purposes, a more favourable time could not have been chosen for visiting England." As he further explained, "When Mrs. Stowe arrived in England... the book from the one side of the Atlantic, the address (by James Sherman) from the other side... awakened more attention to the anti-slavery cause in England, in 1853, than had existed since the agitation of the emancipation question in 1832." Ward, having met Mrs. Stowe at the house of Rev. James Sherman, next door to his Surrey Chapel on Blackfriars Road, in May 1853, was invited to stay at the Surrey Chapel Parsonage along with Mrs Stowe's husband, the Rev. Dr. Calvin Stowe, and her brother Rev. Charles Beecher, for three weeks.

On June 7, 1853, Samuel Ward was able to deliver his major London anti-slavery speech, and had secured Lord Shaftesbury to take the chair. Ward's address had a successful impact, for almost immediately—21 June—it led to the formation of a London Committee to seek financial support for the Anti-Slavery Society of Canada. The Committee comprised Lord Shaftesbury, Rev. J. Sherman, and S. H. Horman-Fisher, with G. W. Alexander its treasurer. This led to several months of hectic speaking engagements for Samuel Ward. He received invitations to speak at the London Missionary Society, kindred charities, and the pulpits of the most distinguished Dissenting divines in the land. Travelling in these causes took him to almost every county in England, and then on to Scotland. After just ten months, some £1,200 had been donated and it was possible to bring the organising committee to a close. A final, large meeting was held at Crosby Hall on March 20, 1854, chaired by Samuel Gurney, where Samuel Ward was accompanied by many of those who had helped him—Rev. James Sherman, Samuel Horman Horman-Fisher, L. A. Chamerovzow, Esq., Rev. James Hamilton D.D., Rev. John Macfarlane, and Josiah Conder.

Samuel Ward's success enabled the Anti-slavery society of Canada to finance its work in support of escaped slaves from the USA, and in the following year, 1855 Ward published his influential book recounting all that he had achieved. The proceeds enabled him to retire to Jamaica.

Death and memory
Samuel Ringgold Ward died in 1866 after spending his last 11 years of life as a minister and farmer in Jamaica.

References

Notes

Further reading

Published books
 Ward, Samuel Ringgold (1855; reprinted 1970 and 1996) Autobiography of a Fugitive Negro: His Anti-slavery Labours in the United States, Canada, & England. 1st edn Toronto: John Snow.
 Burke, Ronald K. (1995). Samuel Ringgold Ward: Christian Abolitionist. New York & London: Garland Publishing, Inc., 1995
 Price, Monique (2004). Samuel Ringgold Ward.

Dissertations
 Burke, Ronald K. (1975). "Samuel Ringgold Ward: Christian Abolitionist."  Ph.D. diss., Syracuse University.

Journal articles 
 Burke, Ronald K. (1972). "THE IMPARTIAL CITIZEN of Samuel Ringgold Ward," Journalism Quarterly 49: 759–760.
 ___ (1978). "The Antislavery Activities of Samuel Ringgold Ward in New York State," Afro-Americans in New York Life and History, 2: 17–28.
 ___ (1996). "Samuel Ringgold Ward and Black Abolitionism: Rhetoric of Assimilated Christology," The Journal of Communication and Religion. 19: 61–71.
 Kerr-Ritchie, J. R.(2012). "Samuel Ward and the making of an imperial subject," Slavery and Abolition 33(2): 205-219.

External links
 Biography at the Dictionary of Canadian Biography Online

1817 births
1860s deaths
Year of death uncertain
American newspaper editors
American Congregationalists
African-American abolitionists
19th-century American memoirists
African-American non-fiction writers
19th-century American journalists
American male journalists
19th-century American male writers
New York (state) Libertyites
New York (state) Free Soilers
Oneida Institute alumni
Fugitive American slaves
People from Maryland
African Free School alumni
American emigrants to Canada
American expatriates in the United Kingdom
People who wrote slave narratives
American emigrants to Jamaica
Congregationalist abolitionists
19th-century African-American writers
Literate American slaves